Haicang is one of the six county-level districts of Xiamen, People's Republic of China, and one of the four located on the mainland proper, as opposed to on Xiamen Island.

History 
Haicang has always been the port of call for incoming trade to Xiamen. In May 1989, the Chinese government established the Haicang investment zone as a petrochemical industrial area within Xinglin District for Taiwanese business magnate Wang Yongqing. Since then, Haicang has developed into a world class port, which serves as an industrial and agricultural base for exports.

Geography
The Haicang District Investment Zone is located on the lowermost left (or northern) bank of the Jiulongjiang River, to the west of Xiamen Island.

The urban (eastern) area of the District is separated from Xiamen Island by an -stretch of water crossed by the Haicang Bridge.

Administration 
The Haicang District was established in 2003 on the bulk of the territory of the old Xinglin District, which had already pipelined a Taiwanese-invested Investment Zone.

Civil

Subdistricts
 Haicang (Hai-ts'ang)
 Xinyang
 Songyu
 Dongfu 

Others
 Haicang Govt Farm
 Number One Govt Farm
 Tianzhu Mountain Govt Forest

Investment Zone

During its planning, the district executive divided its Investment Zone into functional areas:

Developmental focus is on port transportation, the energy industry and warehousing (bonded storage). As many as 36 storage facilities capable of handing over 10,000 metric tons will be built (ten facilities in the first phase). The port railway spur of the Yingtan-Xiamen Railway was completed in 1999. The 5 kilometer deep water port is predicted to handle 90 million tons of goods annually.
Developmental  focus is on technology, especially capital-intensive heavy industry - machinery, electronics, metallurgy, and chemical fibre industries. Middle and downstream petro-chemical projects are especially favoured.
Developmental focus is on real estate and tertiary industry. There are already facilities such as banks, commerce and trade centers, tourist locations, public communication areas, primary and secondary schools, professional training centers, hospitals, hotels, recreation, entertainment and cafes.
Xinyang Industrial Area is a key industrial area for both Haicang and the whole Xiamen municipal region. Infrastructure facilities, including roads, water supply, power supply, post, drainage and waste discharge, are top-notch. There are commercial, real estate and public facilities. Over a hundred projects have planned in the area, and over thirty are in production; when all have reached full production, their total value will be around 10 billion yuan.
Dongfu Industrial Area and Xiamen Export Processing Zone (AEPZ, 出口加工区) have subsidiary, special roles in the District's Investment Zone plan.

Economy 
The government of the Haicang Investment Zone actively invites foreign investment in high technology and capital intensive industries with emphasis on electronics, manufacturing, petrochemicals, machinery, refined chemicals, new building materials, biotechnology and pharmaceuticals.

See also

References

External links

Guide to Xiamen
 Official website 

Geography of Xiamen
County-level divisions of Fujian